Ireland competed at the 2016 Winter Youth Olympics in Lillehammer, Norway from 12 to 21 February 2016.

Alpine skiing

Boys

See also
Ireland at the 2016 Summer Olympics

References

2016 in Irish sport
Nations at the 2016 Winter Youth Olympics
Ireland at the Youth Olympics